A system in stratigraphy is a sequence of strata (rock layers) that were laid down together within the same corresponding geological period. The associated period is a chronological time unit, a part of the geological time scale, while the system is a unit of chronostratigraphy. Systems are unrelated to lithostratigraphy, which subdivides rock layers on their lithology. Systems are subdivisions of erathems and are themselves divided into series and stages.

Systems in the geological timescale
The systems of the Phanerozoic were defined during the 19th century, beginning with the Cretaceous (by Belgian geologist Jean d'Omalius d'Halloy in the Paris Basin) and the Carboniferous (by British geologists William Conybeare and William Phillips) in 1822). The Paleozoic and Mesozoic were divided into the currently used systems before the second half of the 19th century, except for a minor revision when the Ordovician system was added in 1879.

The Cenozoic has seen more recent revisions by the International Commission on Stratigraphy. It has been divided into three systems with the Paleogene and Neogene replacing the former Tertiary System though the succeeding Quaternary remains. The one-time system names of Paleocene, Eocene, Oligocene, Miocene and Pliocene are now series within the Paleogene and Neogene.

Another recent development is the official division of the Proterozoic into systems, which was decided in 2004.

Notes

References

 Hedberg, H.D., (editor), International stratigraphic guide: A guide to stratigraphic classification, terminology, and procedure, New York, John Wiley and Sons, 1976
 International Stratigraphic Chart from the International Commission on Stratigraphy
 USA National Park Service
 Washington State University
 Web Geological Time Machine
 Eon or Aeon, Math Words - An alphabetical index

External links
The Global Boundary Stratotype Section and Point (GSSP): overview
Chart of The Global Boundary Stratotype Sections and Points (GSSP): chart
Geotime chart displaying geologic time periods compared to the fossil record - Deals with chronology and classifications for laymen (not GSSPs)
International Commission on Stratigraphy page on Chronostratigraphy : overview

 
Chronostratigraphy
.
Geochronology
Geologic time scales
Geology terminology
Geological units
Stratigraphy